Cloud cover (also known as cloudiness, cloudage, or cloud amount) refers to the fraction of the sky obscured by clouds on average when observed from a particular location. Okta is the usual unit for measurement of the cloud cover. The cloud cover is correlated to the sunshine duration as the least cloudy locales are the sunniest ones while the cloudiest areas are the least sunny places, as clouds can block sunlight, especially on sunrise and sunset where sunlight is already limited.

The global cloud cover averages around 0.68 when analyzing clouds with optical depth larger than 0.1. This value is lower (0.56) when considering clouds with an optical depth larger than 2, and higher when counting subvisible cirrus clouds. Particularly over the oceans cloud cover is persistent with an average 72% of cloud cover.

Role in the climate system 

Clouds play multiple critical roles in the climate system and diurnal cycle. In particular, being bright objects in the visible part of the solar spectrum, they efficiently reflect light to space and thus contribute to the cooling of the planet, as well as trapping remaining heat at night. Cloud cover thus plays an important role in the energetic balance of the atmosphere and a variation of it is a factor and consequence of and to the climate change expected by recent studies.

Variability 

Cloud cover values only vary by 0.03 from year to year averages, whereas the local, day to day variability in cloud amount typically rises to 0.3 over the globe. Most data sets agree on the fact that the land is covered by 0.10–0.15 less cloud than the oceans due to the seas covered with water, meaning much more evaporation possible.

Lastly, there is a latitudinal variation in the cloud cover, such that around 20°N there are regions with 0.10 less cloudiness than the global mean. Almost the same variation (0.15 instead of 0.10) is found 20°S. This is because of the absence of equatorial effects and strong winds reducing cloud formation. On the other hand, in the storm regions of the Southern Hemisphere midlatitudes were found to have with 0.15–0.25 more cloudiness than the global mean at 60°S. On average, about 67% of the entire Earth is cloud-covered at any moment.

On a continental scale, it can be noticed based upon a long-term satellite recording of cloudiness data that on a year-mean basis, Europe, North America, South America and Asia are dominated by cloudy skies due to the westerlies, monsoon or other effects. On the other hand, Africa, the Middle East and Australia are dominated by clear skies due to their continentality and aridity.

On a regional scale, it can be also worthy of note that some exceptionally humid areas of Earth experience cloudy conditions virtually all time such as South America's Amazon Rainforest while some highly arid areas experience clear-sky conditions virtually all time such as Africa's Sahara Desert.

Altitude of typical cloud cover 

Although clouds can exist within a wide range of altitudes, typical cloud cover has a base at approximately 4,000m and extends up to an altitude of about 5,000m. Clouds height can vary depending on latitude; with cloud cover in polar latitudes being slightly lower and in tropical regions the cloud cover may extend up to 8,000m. The type of cloud is also a factor, with low cumulus clouds sitting at 300-1,500m while high cirrus clouds at 5,500-6,500m.

References 

 McIntosh, D. H. (1972) Meteorological Glossary, Her Majesty's Stationery Office, Met. O. 842, A.P. 897, 319 p.

External links 

 NSDL.arm.gov, Glossary of Atmospheric Terms, From the National Science Digital Library's Atmospheric Visualization Collection.
 Earthobersvatory.nasa.gov, Monthly maps of global cloud cover from NASA's Earth Observatory
 International Satellite Cloud Climatology Project (ISCCP),  NASA's data products on their satellite observations 
 NASA composite satellite image.

Clouds
Articles containing video clips

fr:Nuage#Nébulosité et opacité